Peter Jurko (born 22 September 1967) is a former alpine skier who competed for Czechoslovakia in the 1988 Winter Olympics and 1992 Winter Olympics.

References

External links
 

1967 births
Living people
Slovak male alpine skiers
Olympic alpine skiers of Czechoslovakia
Czechoslovak male alpine skiers
Alpine skiers at the 1988 Winter Olympics
Alpine skiers at the 1992 Winter Olympics
Universiade medalists in alpine skiing
Universiade gold medalists for Czechoslovakia
Competitors at the 1987 Winter Universiade
Competitors at the 1991 Winter Universiade